Amblyodipsas teitana, also known as the Taita Hills purple-glossed snake or Teitana purple-glossed snake, is a species of venomous rear-fanged snake in the family Atractaspididae. It is endemic to the Taita Hills in Kenya, and only known from the holotope, a  female, first identified as Calamelaps unicolor by Arthur Loveridge in 1936.

References

 Loveridge, A. 1936. Scientific results of an expedition to rain forest regions in Eastern Africa. V. Reptiles. Bull. Mus. Comp. Zool. 79:207-337.
 Branch, Bill. 2005. A Photographic Guide to Snakes, Other Reptiles and Amphibians of East Africa. Struik. Cape Town. p. 67.

Atractaspididae
Snakes of Africa
Reptiles of Kenya
Endemic fauna of Kenya
Reptiles described in 1971
Taxa named by Donald George Broadley